Mohamed Rizk (born 25 January 1988) is an Egyptian footballer who plays as an attacking midfielder for El-Geish in the Egyptian Premier League on loan from Al Ahly.

References

1988 births
Living people
Egyptian footballers
Egypt international footballers
Egyptian Premier League players
Association football midfielders
Al Ahly SC players
Tala'ea El Gaish SC players
Al Mokawloon Al Arab SC players